Howard University School of Law (Howard Law or HUSL) is the law school of Howard University, a private, federally chartered historically black research university in Washington, D.C. It is one of the oldest law schools in the country and the oldest historically black law school in the United States.

Today, Howard University School of Law confers about 185 Juris Doctor and Master of Law degrees annually to students from the United States and countries in South America, the Caribbean, Africa, and Asia. Howard University School of Law was accredited by the American Bar Association and the Association of American Law Schools in 1931.

History
Howard University opened its legal department, led by John Mercer Langston, on January 6, 1869. The founders of Howard Law recognized "a great need to train lawyers who would have a strong commitment to helping black Americans secure and protect their newly established rights" during the country's tumultuous Reconstruction era.

The first class consisted of six students who met three evenings a week in the homes and offices of the department's four teachers. Classes were held in various locations throughout the years before the law school settled into its current location at 2900 Van Ness Street N.W. in 1974. At the time, the LL.B program required only two years of study.  Ten students were awarded degrees at the first commencement ceremony, which was held on February 3, 1871.

The school was accredited by the American Bar Association and the Association of American Law Schools in 1931.

Women at Howard Law
Howard Law was the first school in the nation to have a non-discriminatory admissions policy. From its founding, it admitted white male and female students along with black students. It was a progressive policy at the time to admit women, but only eight women graduated from Howard Law during the first 30 years of its existence.

An 1890 review of women lawyers in the United States published in The Green Bag, found that many women had difficulty being admitted to law school, or gaining admission to the bar, and practice, even at Howard.

Charlotte E. Ray was admitted to Howard's law program in 1869 and graduated in 1872, becoming its first black female lawyer. It is reported that Ray applied for admission to the bar using initials for her given and middle names, in order to disguise her gender, because she was "[a]ware of the school's reluctant commitment to the principle of sexual equality."

Mary Ann Shadd Cary was among four women enrolled in the law school in 1880. She said in 1890 that she had actually been admitted to Howard's law program in September 1869, prior to Ray. However, Cary claims she was barred from graduating on time because of her gender and did not graduate until 1883.

Eliza A. Chambers, an early white female graduate of Howard's law program, was admitted in 1885 and successfully completed the three-year course of study, earning two diplomas. But, "the Law School faculty refused to hand in [Eliza's] name to the examiners, for admission to practice, omitting her from the list of her male classmates whom they recommended, simply because she was a woman." After that, she succeeded in entering practice.

Ties to the civil rights movement
Howard University School of Law has significant ties to the civil rights movement. Former HUSL Dean Charles Hamilton Houston's work for the NAACP earned him the title of "The Man Who Killed Jim Crow." Thurgood Marshall, a 1933 graduate of Howard Law, successfully argued the landmark Brown v. Board of Education case before the U.S. Supreme Court and in 1967 became the first African-American Supreme Court Justice. In 1950, Howard law graduate Pauli Murray published States' Laws on Race and Color, an examination and critique of state segregation laws throughout the nation. Thurgood Marshall called the book the "bible" of the civil rights movement. In 1952 and again in 1953, two HUSL professors, James Nabrit Jr. and George E. C. Hayes, successfully argued the landmark Supreme Court case Bolling v. Sharpe, a companion case to Brown v. Board of Education.

Academics

Curriculum

First year students at Howard Law are required to take courses on civil procedure; constitutional law; contracts; criminal law; legislative regulations; legal reasoning, research and writing; real property; and torts. Students must also take courses on evidence and professional responsibility and fulfill the school's scholarly writing requirement.

The school offers more than 90 courses beyond the first year curriculum.

Degrees offered
Howard University School of Law offers the Juris Doctor (J.D.) and the Master of Laws (LL.M.). Additionally, students can enroll in the four-year J.D./M.B.A. dual degree program with the Howard University School of Business.

HUSL students can also earn a certificate in family law.

Faculty
As of Fall 2013, Howard Law employed 56 faculty and administrators. The school's student-faculty ratio was 16.52 to 1.

Programs and clinics
Howard Law boasts three institutes and centers: the Education Rights Center, the Institute of Intellectual Property and Social Justice, and the World Food Law Institute.

The school's Clinical Law Center also offers seven in-house legal clinics that provide students with first-hand legal experience as well as an Externship and Equal Justice Program. These clinics are:
Alternative Dispute Resolution Clinic
Child Welfare Clinic
Civil Rights Clinic
Criminal Justice Clinic
Fair Housing Clinic
Intellectual Property and Trademark Clinic
Investor Justice and Education Clinic

Publications 
Howard Law has published the student-managed Howard Law Journal since 1955. The school also publishes the Howard Human & Civil Rights Law Review, formerly known as the Human Rights & Globalization Law Review and the successor to the Howard Scroll: Social Justice Law Review.

The Barrister is the HUSL student-edited newspaper.

The school publishes a news journal, The Jurist, and the Howard Docket newsletter. For the school's 140th anniversary, the school published A Legacy of Defending the Constitution: A Pictorial History Book of Howard University School of Law (1869-2009).

Student life

Howard Law enrolled 407 J.D. students for the 2012-2013 academic year, 100% of whom were enrolled full-time. 84.5% of the J.D. students were African-American and 63.4% were female. As of 2016, the law school admits 39.3% of applicants. HUSL students may participate in 26 extra-curricular groups, including the moot court team, associations focused on specific areas of law, law fraternities, and political, ethnic, and religious affiliation groups.

Campus
The campus is located at 2900 Van Ness St NW, Washington, DC 20008 in the upper Northwest quadrant of Washington, D.C., in the Forest Hills area of the city.  It is a few blocks from the University of the District of Columbia and the headquarters of Intelsat. The law school is located on its own  campus approximately five miles from the main campus.

The campus was built by Dunbarton College of the Holy Cross, which occupied it until the school closed in 1973. The school's main building, Houston Hall, is named after Charles Hamilton Houston. The library was named after Vernon Jordan after his death in March 2021.

Admissions
Howard Law had a 41.2% acceptance rate in 2013 with the school receiving 1,085 applications. The school's matriculation rate was 33.8% with 151 of the 447 admits enrolling. The median LSAT score for students enrolling in HUSL in 2013 was 151 (47.8th percentile) and the median GPA was 3.13.

Employment 
According to Howard Law's official 2013 ABA-required disclosures, 50% of the Class of 2013 obtained full-time, long-term, bar passage-required employment nine months after graduation. HUSL's full-time long-term bar passage-required employment rate for 2013 graduates was below the national average of 57% for ABA-approved law schools.

301 firms recruit at Howard Law, a number that is comparable to "Top 14" law schools like Yale Law School (where 326 firms recruit) and Cornell Law School (where 211 firms recruit) and includes elite firms like Cravath, Swaine & Moore, which only conducts interviews at 21 law schools. But while more than 60% students who graduated from Yale Law School and Cornell Law School in 2013 were hired for federal clerkships or at law firms with more than 250 employees, only 13% of 2013 Howard Law graduates secured such positions.

Howard Law's Law School Transparency under-employment score is 18.1%, indicating the percentage of the Class of 2013 unemployed, pursuing an additional degree, or working in a non-professional, short-term, or part-time job nine months after graduation. 84% of the Class of 2013 was employed in some capacity while 0.7% were pursuing graduate degrees and 10.9% were unemployed nine months graduation.

Howard Law placed 45th on the 2014 National Law Journal "Top 50 Go-To" list, climbed to No. 22 on the 2015 list, and fell to a respectable 37th for the 2016 list, and climbed back to 32nd for the 2017 list. The list ranks the top 50 schools by the percentage of JDs who accept first-year associate positions at the 100 largest firms.

Costs
The total cost of attendance (indicating the cost of tuition, fees, and living expenses) at Howard Law for the 2014-2015 academic year is $60,240 with tuition set at $31,148. The $60,240 total cost of attendance at Howard Law is lower than some schools in the D.C. area — for example George Washington University Law School's total cost of attendance is $78,040 for the 2014-2015 academic year — but higher than others, such as the University of the District of Columbia's David A. Clarke School of Law where the total cost of attendance for D.C. residents for the 2013-2014 school year was $41,630.

The Law School Transparency estimated debt-financed cost of attendance for three years is $229,755.

Rankings
U.S. News & World Report ranked Howard Law as a top 100 law school in 2023.

Notable alumni

Civil rights activism 

 Louis Berry, civil rights activist in Louisiana
 Mary Ann Shad Cary, first black woman to cast a vote in a national election
Danielle Conway, first African-American dean of Maine Law School
Mahala Ashley Dickerson, first African-American elected as president of the National Association of Women Lawyers
Emma Gillett, co-founder of American University's Washington College of Law and the first woman to be appointed notary public by the President of the United States
Letitia James, First African American woman to hold citywide office in New York City.
Edward W. Jacko (1916–1979) American Civil Rights attorney, defended Nation of Islam.
Pauli Murray, was an American civil rights activist, women's rights activist, lawyer, and author. She was also the first black woman ordained an Episcopal priest.
Zephyr Moore Ramsey (1893–1984), lawyer based in Southern California
Charlotte E. Ray, first African American female lawyer
Dovey Johnson Roundtree, Army officer, civil rights lawyer, and A.M.E. Church minister

Judges 

Henry Lee Adams Jr., United States District Court Judge
Loretta Copeland Biggs, United States District Court Judge
William Bryant, United States District Court Judge
Robert L. Carter, United States District Court Judge
Wiley Young Daniel, United States District Court Judge
James Dean, county judge and first African-American judge in Florida
Leland DeGrasse, New York Supreme Court (Appellate Division) Judge
George W. Draper III, Supreme Court of Missouri Judge
Richard Erwin, United States District Court Judge
Wilkie D. Ferguson, United States District Court Judge
William P. Greene, Judge to the United States Court of Appeals for Veteran Claims
LaShann Moutique DeArcy Hall, United States District Court Judge
Joseph Woodrow Hatchett, Chief Judge of the United States Court of Appeals for the Eleventh Circuit
Odell Horton, former United States District Court Judge
J. Curtis Joyner, United States District Court Judge
Damon Keith, United States Court of Appeals Judge
Consuelo Bland Marshall, United States District Court Judge
Thurgood Marshall, first African American United States Supreme Court Justice and first African American Solicitor General of the United States
Vicki Miles-LaGrange, United States District Court Judge
Gabrielle Kirk McDonald, United States District Court Judge and International Criminal Tribunal
Tanya Walton Pratt, United States District Court Judge
Scovel Richardson, United States Court of International Trade Judge
Spottswood William Robinson III, United States Court of Appeals Judge
William M. Skretny, United States District Court Judge
Emmet G. Sullivan, United States District Court Judge
Anne Elise Thompson, United States District Court Judge
Joseph Cornelius Waddy, United States District Court Judge
Alexander Williams Jr., United States District Court Judge
Carolyn Wright, American lawyer, jurist and the Chief Justice of the Fifth Court of Appeals of Texas
John Milton Younge, United States District Court Judge

Politicians 

 Aisha N. Braveboy, former Member of Maryland House of Delegates and current Prince George's County State's Attorney
 Roland Burris, former Illinois United States Senator
 Evandro Carvalho, former Representative, Massachusetts House of Representatives
 Kevin P. Chavous, Council of the District of Columbia Representative
Darcel D. Clark, District Attorney, Bronx County, New York
 Adrian Fenty, former Mayor of Washington, DC
Earl Hilliard, United States House of Representatives
Letitia James, Attorney General of New York
Sharon Pratt Kelly, former Mayor of Washington, DC
Summer Lee, Pennsylvania House of Representatives
Janeese Lewis George, member of the Council of the District of Columbia 
Henry L. Marsh, former Mayor of Richmond, Virginia and Virginia State Senator
Gregory Meeks, United States House of Representatives
James E. O'Hara, United States House of Representatives
Vincent Orange, former Member of the Council of the District of Columbia 
Kasim Reed, former Mayor of Atlanta, Georgia
Hugh Shearer, former Prime Minister of Jamaica
Walter Washington, first Mayor of Washington, DC
Togo D. West Jr., former United States Secretary of Veteran Affairs under Bill Clinton.
L. Douglas Wilder, first African-American United States Governor since Reconstruction and former Mayor of Richmond Virginia
C. T. Wilson, Member, Maryland House of Delegates
Harris Wofford, United States Senate

Other 
Denise George, Attorney General of the United States Virgin Islands
Prince Joel Dawit Makonnen, Ethiopian prince
Cheryl L. Johnson, 36th Clerk of the United States House of Representatives
Vernon Jordan, former president of the National Urban League and Senior Managing Director with Lazard Freres
Gladys Tignor Peterson, educator in Washington, D.C.
Leigh Whipper, actor

See also 

 Howard University

References

External links
 

Forest Hills (Washington, D.C.)
Howard University
Law schools in Washington, D.C.
Educational institutions established in 1869
1869 establishments in Washington, D.C.
Historically black law schools